Ernest Blount (3 December 1885 – 23 April 1966) was a British wrestler. He competed in the men's Greco-Roman lightweight at the 1908 Summer Olympics.

References

External links
 

1885 births
1966 deaths
British male sport wrestlers
Olympic wrestlers of Great Britain
Wrestlers at the 1908 Summer Olympics
Place of birth missing